The Province of Belluno is a province in the Veneto region of Italy. Its capital is the city of Belluno.

Geography
Situated in the Alps, the province of Belluno consists almost entirely of mountainous terrain. It encompasses the natural and historical regions of Cadore, Feltrino, Alpago, Val di Zoldo, Agordino, Comelico and Ampezzano. The eastern part of the province is home to the Dolomites, including Tofane, Marmolada, Tre Cime di Lavaredo, and Antelao. For much of its course, the river Piave, runs through Belluno, as do its affluents the Boite and the Cordevole.

The southern part is called Valbelluna, the widest and most populous valley of the province, which is bordered by the Venetian Prealps. The National Park of Belluno Dolomites is located in the province.

Climate
The province of Belluno's climate is among the most severe in the Alps. It is mostly influenced by the continental, provided by the Dolomites and it is very similar to the eastern Tyrol's climate, or even more severe in the Prealps of the southern side.

The province may be divided in the following climatic zones:

The hottest month's average temperature is between 18 °C and 21 °C. This area, as most of the oriental Alps, is very wet. Belluno's precipitation average is above 1300 mm per year, snow is usual during all the winter months, and may occur even in March or November. Some years the winter may be milder due to the humidity, with averages around the freezing point, and big snowfalls with frequent snowbound. Main cities in this area: Belluno, Feltre, Seren del Grappa.
The midland's valleys, between 700 m and 1500 m (or until 1300 meters in the Prealps area), which have a typical humid continental climate Dfb. This climate is more severe in the extreme northern or southwestern regions of the province, while the central region (near Arabba or Cortina d’Ampezzo) is usually milder. Winter's average temperature is between −7 °C and −5 °C in the North and Southwest during January, and between −5 °C and −3 °C around the central region. The coldest town, Santo Stefano di Cadore, at an elevation of only 900 meters, has temperature averages in January between −7 °C and −6 °C. Other towns of relatively low elevations have really low averages, which would be found only above 1700 meters in other Italians provinces, as well as in any French or western Swiss provinces. The snow season depends on the altitude. Between 700 and 1200 meters, from early November until the middle of March, between 1200 and 1500 (or 1600 in Arabba), from late October until late April. The summer is usually wet and mild, but hotter than areas at the same altitude in the occidental valleys. In the lower lands (around 900 meters) temperature average around 16 °C or 17 °C. In higher lands (around 1400 meters) average around 14 °C. Rain is usual from March until November. Some towns and villages with this climate: Santo Stefano di Cadore (severe), Cortina d'Ampezzo (mild – sometimes Cfb), Arabba (mild if considered the altitude), Auronzo di Cadore (severe), Danta di Cadore, Sappada.
The valleys around 1500 to 1900 meters, with cold continental climate Dfc. It is the wettest climate of the province. Winters are very cold and snowy, with temperature averages between −9 °C and −5 °C. The snow season usually starts in late September and lasts until late May Snows are not frequents, but can occur even during the summer, in early September or late August. The summer is rainy, sometimes foggy, and cool. Temperatures average in July between 10 °C and 12 °C. This area has a very few numbers of sunny days per year, and the average sunshine hours per day is also quite low, around 1 hour or less in January and around 4 or 5 hours in June and July. Due to the severity of the climate, only a few villages are found in this area, usually fractions of other towns. One of the most inhabited places in this area is Misurina, a village near the lake with the same name.
The high lands, above 1900 meters, with mountain's tundra climate ET. There are no inhabited places in this area. All the months have temperature averages below 10 °C. Above 2000 meters the precipitation rate starts to decrease. The higher places are drier, and sunnier. The winter temperature averages in the mountain areas vary according to the altitude, and are always milder than the valley's temperatures at the same quote. In January, the average temperature in mountains areas are around −3 °C at 1500 m (while they can reach −6 °C in valleys), −6 °C at 2000 m, −8 °C at 2500 m and −10 °C at 3000 meters. Summers are cold above 2000 meters. The average temperature in July is around 12 °C at 1500 m, 8 °C at 2000 m, 6 °C at 2500 and 3 °C at 3000 meters. In Belluno province, the perpetual frost climate EF is not found, because the highest point, the Marmolada, at a few more than 3200 meters, has summer's average temperature of approximately 20 °C.

History

The oldest archaeological find in the province is that of Lagole di Calalzo, in Cadore, belonging to a  sanctuary dedicated to a health god of Paleoveneti. A larger site, a necropolis, has been excavated in the commune of Mel. Findings from these sites are now housed in the Museums of Pieve di Cadore and Mel.

From the 10th to 12th century the area that became Belluno was part of the March of Verona, a march of the Holy Roman Empire. During the 14th century much of the area came under the control of the Carraresi lords of Padua. In 1404 the Carraresi territories, including Feltre and Belluno, were conquered by the Republic of Venice, becoming part of the Venetian . Cadore in the north also became part of the  following the Venetian conquest of Friuli in 1420. In 1511 Maximilian I, Holy Roman Emperor conquered the town of Cortina d'Ampezzo, detaching it from Cadore and incorporating it into the County of Tyrol.

Venetian rule lasted until 1797 when Venice was conquered by the French First Republic during the Italian campaigns of the French Revolutionary Wars. Rather than being annexed by France or its satellites, the Venetian territory east of Lake Garda, including Belluno, was ceded to the Habsburg monarchy (Austria) in the Treaty of Campo Formio, thereby becoming the Venetian Province. This state of affairs only lasted until 1805 however, as Austria (the Austrian Empire since 1804) ceded the Venetian Province to the Napoleonic Kingdom of Italy in the Treaty of Pressburg. Within the Kingdom of Italy, modern Belluno roughly corresponded to the  department.

After the Napoleonic Wars the former Venetian Province was returned to Austria by the 1815 Congress of Vienna, becoming part of the newly formed Kingdom of Lombardy–Venetia. Under Austrian rule Lombardy–Venetia was organised into provinces roughly corresponding to the Napoleonic departments; the Piave department was succeeded by the Province of Belluno, which broadly coincides with the modern province.

During the unification of Italy Austria lost Lombardy–Venetia to what became the Kingdom of Italy (the western part (i.e. Lombardy) in 1859, the eastern part (i.e. Venetia and Mantua) including Belluno in 1866).

In 1919, following World War I, Italy obtained what had been the southern part of the County of Tyrol from Austria-Hungary: Trentino and South Tyrol. In 1923 Cortina d'Ampezzo, Colle Santa Lucia and Livinallongo del Col di Lana were detached from this territory and added to Belluno.

In 1943, when the Italian government signed an armistice with the Allies, the province was occupied by Nazi Germany, which reorganised it (along with the region of Trentino-Südtirol) as the Operation Zone of the Alpine Foothills and put it under the administration of Gauleiter Franz Hofer. The region was de facto annexed to the German Reich until the end of the war. This status ended along with the Nazi regime and Italian rule was restored in 1945.

Economy
Until recently, the province's economy was based on poor mountain agriculture, now less important, with the exception of the cultivation of beans in the Lamon highlands and the production of Piave cheese in the Dolomites valleys. Today, Belluno has one of the most important industrial sectors of northern Italy, the production of eyeglasses (Luxottica has its headquarters in Agordo, for example). Also important are the manufacturing sectors of home appliances (Zanussi and others) and bathroom fixtures (Ceramica Dolomite, IdealStandard).

One of the most important factors of the Bellunese economy is tourism. Cortina d'Ampezzo, Alleghe, Arabba, Sappada, and other locations are renowned in Italy and abroad.

Linguistic minorities
In the province, language minorities are present and recognized by law:
a Ladin minority, recognized in 42 municipalities, is present in the regions of Ladinia (Colle Santa Lucia-Col, Livinallongo del Col di Lana-Fodom and Cortina d'Ampezzo-Anpezo), Cadore, Agordino and Zoldo.
a German-speaking minority was present in the municipalities of Farra d'Alpago and Tambre (now extinct).

Inhabitants with foreign citizenship

The top ten countries of origin of the inhabitants of Belluno with foreign citizenship at December 31, 2018 were:
 Romania 2041
 Ukraine 1397
 Morocco 1383
 Albania 954
 China 922
 North Macedonia 713
 Moldova 597
 Kosovo 546
 Croatia 328
 Brazil 231

Comuni
There are 61 comuni (singular: comune) in the province. As of December 31, 2018, the main comuni by population are:

References

External links 

  Province homepage
 Belluno's map

 
Belluno